Lenape Bridge is a historic stone arch bridge located in Birmingham Township and Pocopson Township, Chester County, Pennsylvania. The bridge was constructed in 1911–1912, of random rubble stone.

It was listed on the National Register of Historic Places in 1988.

References 
 

Road bridges on the National Register of Historic Places in Pennsylvania
Bridges completed in 1912
Bridges in Chester County, Pennsylvania
1912 establishments in Pennsylvania
National Register of Historic Places in Chester County, Pennsylvania
Stone arch bridges in the United States